"Honesty" is a song by British post-punk revival band Editors. It was released digitally on 25 November 2013, as the third single to promote the band's fourth studio album, The Weight of Your Love.

Composition

"Honesty" was written by Edward Lay, Russell Leetch, Justin Lockey, Tom Smith and Elliott Williams. The song is a "string-driven midtempo ballad," and "a soaring, vulnerable number complete with Tom Smith's signature baritone vocals- and a touch of falsetto. The atmospheric track continues to build in momentum as it proceeds, telling the familiar tale of a broken heart atop an anthemic chorus, dramatic drums and spectacular strings."

Music video

A music video for the song, directed by Favourite Colour: Black, was released on 21 October 2013. It was filmed on 20 September 2013 around Soho and Shaftesbury Avenue in London. It features "a hen party, a young streetwise girl and a scary-looking vagrant." "It's all shot from my point of view, and I kind of encounter all these 'undesirables' along the way," said Editors' frontman Tom Smith in an interview with XFM.

Track listing

Charts

References

Editors (band) songs
2013 songs
2013 singles
PIAS Recordings singles
Songs written by Edward Lay
Songs written by Russell Leetch
Songs written by Tom Smith (musician)
Songs written by Justin Lockey
Songs written by Elliott Williams
Song recordings produced by Jacquire King